Augeas is a free software  configuration-management library, written in the C programming language.  It is licensed under the terms of the GNU Lesser General Public License.

Augeas uses programs called  lenses (in reference to the Harmony Project) to map a filesystem to an XML tree which can then be parsed using an XPath syntax, using a bidirectional transformation. Writing such lenses extends the amount of files Augeas can parse.

Bindings 

Augeas has bindings for Python, Ruby, OCaml, Perl, Haskell, Java, PHP, and Tcl.

Programs using augeas 

 Certbot, ACME client
 Puppet provides an Augeas module which makes use of the Ruby bindings
 SaltStack provides an Augeas module which makes use of the python bindings

References

External links 

 

Configuration management